A bifid penis (or double penis) is a rare congenital defect where two genital tubercles develop.

Many species of male marsupials have a naturally bifurcated penis, with left and right prongs that they insert into multiple vaginal canals simultaneously.

See also
 Diphallia
 Meatotomy
 Penile subincision

References

Congenital disorders of male genital organs
Penis disorders
Marsupial anatomy
Intersex variations